Montana's 1st congressional district is a congressional district in the United States House of Representatives that was apportioned after the 2020 United States census. The first candidates ran in the 2022 elections for a seat in the 118th United States Congress.

History 
From 1913 to 1993, Montana had two congressional seats. From 1913 to 1919, those seats were elected statewide at-large on a general ticket. After 1919, however, the state was divided into geographical districts, with the 1st district covering the western part of the state, including Missoula, Great Falls, Butte, and Helena.

Following the release of the 2020 United States census results, Montana was once again split into two congressional districts. The reconstituted 1st district covers the western third of the state, in a configuration similar to the 1983–1993 map. However, Helena was drawn into the reconstituted 2nd district.

Statewide election results

List of members representing the district

Recent election results

2022

See also 
 Montana's congressional districts
 List of United States congressional districts

References 
General

Specific

 Congressional Biographical Directory of the United States 1774–present

01
Constituencies established in 1919
1919 establishments in Montana
Constituencies disestablished in 1993
1993 disestablishments in Montana
Constituencies established in 2023
2023 establishments in Montana